Velardi is a surname. Notable people with the surname include:

Luciano Velardi (born 1981), Italian footballer
Paola Velardi (born 1955), Italian computer scientist
 Valerie Velardi, ex-wife of Robin Williams

See also
Velarde (disambiguation)

Italian-language surnames